Cindy Davis (born January 1977 from Atwater, California, United States) is a retired professional American Bicycle Motocross (BMX) racer whose prime competitive years were from (1988–1998). She was the first woman to win five American Bicycle Association (ABA) cups in a row, and the first rider to own five Number One Cups (over both 20 inch and Girls Cruiser). She was founding member of ABA's Girl Pro class. An accumulation of injuries in 1998 ended her career. During the course of her career she achieved 350 National wins.  She got the moniker of "Loopy" when at the 1989 ABA Grandnationals in her 12 girls main. She applied so much power down the first straight she looped out, i.e. did an uncontrolled "wheelie", over balanced and fell backward onto her back, a maneuver that resembled a plane doing a half loop. Due to this crash she lost her bid to repeat as national no.1 girl.

Racing career milestones

Note: Professional first are on the national level unless otherwise indicated.

Career factory and major bike shop sponsors

Note: This listing only denotes the racer's primary sponsors. At any given time a racer could have numerous ever-changing co-sponsors. Primary sponsorships can be verified by BMX press coverage and sponsor's advertisements at the time in question. When possible exact dates are used.

Amateur
 Ralph's Bicycles: 1986-Mid 1987
 Radical Rascals: Mid 1987-October 1987
 White Bear: October 1987-Late July 1988
 Ralph's Bicycles: Early August 1988-November 1988
 Tru Color/Titan Racing: December 1988-Early December 1990. After the 1990 ABA Grandnationals the Tru Color/Titan Racing team was disbanded.
 R & C Racing: January 1991-thru December 1992
 GT Racing: January 1994-December 1994
 Hyper: 1995
 Free Agent: January 1996-December 1996
 Odyssey: November 1996 – 1998

Professional/Super Girls
 Odyssey: November 1996 – 1998

Career bicycle motocross titles

Note: Listed are District, State/Provincial/Department, Regional, National, and International titles in italics. Depending on point totals of individual racers, winners of Grand Nationals do not necessarily win National titles. Only sanctioning bodies active during the racer's career are listed. Series and one off Championships are also listed in block.

Amateur
National Bicycle League (NBL)
 None
American Bicycle Association (ABA)
 1984 7-8 Girls California State Champion
 1984 California District #15 (CA-15) No.1 Girl
 1985 8 Girls Summer Season CA-19 No.1 Girl (DAG)
 1985 Summer Season CA-19 No.1 Girl
 1985 CA-19 No.1 Girl
 1986 9 Girls Race of Champions Champion
 1986 CA-19 No.1 Girl
 1987 CA-10 No.1 Girl
 1987 10 Girls Superbowl of BMX Champion West
 1987 10 Girls Gold Cup West Champion.
 1987 10 Girls Northern California State Champion
 1987 10 Girls Race of Champions Champion
 1987 10 Girls National No.2 Girl
 1988 California District #10 (CA-10) No.1 Girl
 1988 11 Girls Northern California State Champion
 1988 11 Girls Race of Champions Champion
 1988 11 Girls and 12 & Under Girls Cruiser Grandnational Champion
 1988 12 & Under Cruiser National No.2
 1988 11 Girls NAG and National No.1 Girl. She won a Yamaha MX motorcycle with the national girls title.
 1989 12 Girls Gold Cup West Champion.
 1989 12 Girl Northern California State Champion
 1989 13 & Under Girls Cruiser Grandnational Champion
 1989 California District #10 (CA-10) No.1 Girl
 1989 12 Girls Race of Champions Champion.
 1989 12 & Under Girls Cruiser No.1 (NAG)
 1989 National Girls Cruiser No.2
 1989 National Girls No.3
 1990 13 Girls Gold Cup West Champion
 1990 California District #10 (CA-10) No.1 Girl
 1990 13 & Over Girls Cruiser Race of Champions Champion.
 1990 13 Girls and 13 & Over Girls Cruiser Grandnational Champion
 1990 Girls Cruiser National No.3 Overall and 13 & Over Girls Cruiser National No.2 NAG
 1991 14 Girls Gold Cup West Champion
 1991 14 Girls U.S Open West Champion
 1991 14 Girls and 14 & Over Girls Cruiser Grandnational Champion.
 1991 National No.1 Girl Cruiser
 1992 15 Girls and 14 & Over Girls Cruiser Race of Champions Champion
 1992 15 & Over Girls East-Vs-West Shootout Champion
 1993 California District #10 (CA-10) Girls Cruiser No.1
 1993 National No.1 Girl Cruiser
 1994 17 & Over Girls and 17 & Over Girls Cruiser World Cup Champion
 1994 17 & Over Girls US Open East Champion
 1994 17 & Over Girls Gold Cup East Champion
 1994 National No.1 Girl Cruiser
 1995 17 & Over Girls Grandnational Champion
 1995 National No.1 Girl
 1995, 1996 17 & Over Girls World Cup Champion
 1996 17 & Over Girls Grandnational Champion

United States Bicycle Motocross Association (USBA)

Fédération Internationale Amateur de Cyclisme (FIAC)*
 None
International Bicycle Motocross Federation (IBMXF)*

Union Cycliste Internationale (UCI)*
 1994 17 Junior Women World Champion.

*See note in professional section

Professional/Super Girls

National Bicycle League (NBL)

American Bicycle Association (ABA)

United States Bicycle Motocross Association (USBA)
 None
International Bicycle Motocross Federation (IBMXF)*
 None
Fédération Internationale Amateur de Cyclisme (FIAC)*
 None (FIAC did not have a strictly professional division during its existence)
Union Cycliste Internationale (UCI)*

*Note: Beginning in 1991 the IBMXF and FIAC had been holding joint World Championship events as a transitional phase in merging which began in earnest in 1993. Beginning with the 1996 season the IBMXF and FIAC completed the merger and both ceased to exist as independent entities being integrated into the UCI. Beginning with the 1997 World Championships held in Brighton, England the UCI would officially hold and sanction BMX World Championships and with it inherited all precedents, records, streaks, etc. from both the IBMXF and FIAC.

Pro Series Championships

Notable accolades
 BMXtreme article Named 12th of the Top 90 BMXers of the 90's

Significant injuries
 Due to injuries to her knees she retired in 1998

Racing habits and traits
 She had great gate starts getting the "snap" i.e. the lead literally right out of the gate (a.k.a. "the holeshot"). The July 1991 issue of American BMXer in its coverage of the ABA Spring Nationals (held on the weekend of May 26, 1991 in Napa, California) noted how despite her diminutive size and youth if she got the lead out of the gate the much larger, presumably stronger 19-year-old Christy Homa would find it difficult to pass the 14-year-old when they raced 14 & Over Girls Cruiser Class together:

American BMXer noted her ability in this area again in their coverage of the ABA Mile High Nationals (held on the weekending June 16, 1991 in Greeley, Colorado) in the same issue:

Miscellaneous
Billy Davis, Cindy Davis's elder brother was the youngest track official in the ABA in 1988. He was 13 years old at the time.

BMX press magazine interviews and articles
 "Cindy Davis is #1 Girl" American BMXer June 1989 Vol.11 No.5 pg.26
 Gold Cup West mini interview. American BMXer November 1989 Vol.11 No.10 pg.15 Very brief interview taken after she won her third Gold Cup championship.

BMX magazine covers

Note: Only magazines that were in publication at the time of the racer's career(s) are listed unless specifically noted.

Snap BMX Magazine & Transworld BMX:

BMX World (1990 version)

Bicycles Today & BMX Today (the official Membership publication of the NBL under two different names):

ABA Action, American BMXer, BMXer (the official BMX publication of the ABA under three different names):
 American BMXer June 1989 Vol.11 No.5

References

External links
 The American Bicycle Association (ABA) Website.
 The National Bicycle League (NBL) Website.

1977 births
Living people
American female cyclists
BMX riders
People from Atwater, California
21st-century American women